Cray House may refer to:

in the United States
 Cray House (Stevensville, Maryland), listed on the NRHP
Lorin Cray House, Mankato, Minnesota, listed on the NRHP